Better than Knowing Where You Are is the fourth and final studio album from American pop-punk band Spitalfield. It was released on October 3, 2006, through Victory Records.

Track listing
All songs written by Spitalfield
 "Dare To..." - 0:24
 "The Only Thing that Matters" - 3:16
 "On The Floor" - 2:54
 "Secrets in Mirrors" - 3:01
 "Better than Knowing Where You Are" - 3:19
 "Hold On" - 3:51
 "Won't Back Down" - 3:40
 "Curtain Call" - 2:51
 "Tell Me, Clarice" - 3:39
 "Lasting First Impression" - 3:02
 "Novocaine" - 4:10
 "...Listen" - 4:09

The song "Secrets in Mirrors" was included on the Sony NW-A800 as a sample track.

Personnel
Credits adapted from Discogs

Spitalfield
 Dan Lowder - guitar
 JD Romero - drums
 TJ Milici - bass
 Mark Rose - vocals, guitar

Production
 Ted Jensen - mastering
 Billy Raff - engineer
 Matt Opal - producer, engineer, mixing

Design and Layout
 Chris Strong - cover art , photography
 Doublej - layout

References

2006 albums
Spitalfield albums
Victory Records albums